The 4th Coming (abbreviated T4C), and also known in French as La Quatrième Prophétie, is a massively multiplayer online role-playing game (MMORPG) originally produced by Vircom Interactive for Windows-based operating systems. Vircom opened the first server for testing before releasing server licenses. There are no known release notes for versions prior to the release of version 1.0. The 4th Coming was later purchased by Dialsoft, who sells server licenses and continues to develop the game under the official project name of T4C Next Chapter.

Setting
The game takes place in the world of Althea. Althea spans three islands: Arakas, Raven's Dust, and Stoneheim. The game is set in a time when a prophesied "4th coming" is to occur.

Gameplay 
Players begin by creating a human character. After choosing a name and gender, a number of specific questions lead a basic distribution of attribute points. These questions have five possible answers: one of the five answers provides no benefit at the end of character creation, whilst each of the other four will increase different attributes.  The final part of the character creation allows the player to roll attribute scores. This function is not limited, so a player may choose to use it again until they see fit; however, the maximum value of the character's attributes is limited by the player's responses to the preceding questions. Players then earn experience points and increase the level of their character through various means, including completing tasks given to them by NPC characters within the game. The game also features a magic system including magic weapons, as well as various spells, which are divided into several elemental classes; such as wind and fire.

History 
Vircom Interactive, a subdivision of Vircom, first published The 4th Coming in 1998. In May 2000 version 1.10 of T4C was published, which adding a new interface, groups, private chat rooms, and other improvements.

In June 2003, a deal was finalized between Pole, SARL of France and Vircom to give Pole exclusive operation rights for the European hosting of the game. The game was played by over 500,000 registered players in 2002.

On September 3, 2003 Vircom original CEO and founder Sylvain Durocher filed a piracy complaint in Canada.

On July 3, 2006, Marc Frega (owner of Dialsoft) acquired The 4th Coming from emailing and messaging company Vircom. Dialsoft is now in charge of selling server licenses and continues to expand the game through the V2 project available to all servers who are willing to pay for it. Dialsoft allows other server versions to exist provided they maintain their server license.

References

External links 
 The 4th Coming
 The Next Chapter

1999 video games
Video games developed in Canada
Windows games
Windows-only games
Massively multiplayer online role-playing games
Persistent worlds